James David Autry (September 27, 1954 – March 14, 1984) was a convicted murderer in the U.S. state of Texas, executed by lethal injection.

Autry, a native of Amarillo, had been convicted of shooting 43-year-old Port Arthur convenience store clerk, Shirley Drouet, between the eyes with a .38 caliber pistol on April 20, 1980. He then shot two witnesses in the head, one of whom, Joe Broussard, a Roman Catholic priest, died instantly, while the other, Anthanasios Svarnas, a Greek seaman, survived but was left with permanent brain damage. The crime had been committed with John Alton Sandifer, Autry's roommate. Although no money was missing from the cash register, a carton of beer valued at $2.70 was missing.

On October 4, 1983, he had been strapped in the gurney in the execution chamber, with the needles in his arms, when a stay of execution came through. He would later be executed on March 14, 1984, in the second execution in Texas since the reintroduction of the death penalty in the state after Gregg v. Georgia.

He declined to make a final statement but did request a last meal of a hamburger, French fries, and a Dr Pepper.

Autry was known as "Cowboy" on death row. As to lethal injection he said "it ain't manly" and said he would prefer to be hanged or beheaded. He also said he preferred execution to life in prison. He petitioned the Texas Board of Corrections to have his execution televised, arguing that the execution is not "real" to the people unless they see it. The request was refused.

He is buried at Captain Joe Byrd Cemetery.

See also
 Capital punishment in Texas
 Capital punishment in the United States
 List of people executed in Texas, 1982–1989

References

1954 births
1984 deaths
1980 murders in the United States
American people executed for murder
People from Amarillo, Texas
20th-century executions by Texas
People executed by Texas by lethal injection
Executed people from Texas
People convicted of murder by Texas
20th-century executions of American people